Raymond Koned Kalla Nkongo (born 22 April 1975), known as Kalla, is a Cameroonian former professional footballer who played as a central defender.

His main asset was a powerful physique, and he had already been picked by the Cameroonian national team for three World Cups – and started – in his mid-20s.

Club career
Kalla was born in Douala. After starting professionally at Canon Sportif de Yaoundé, he went on to play in four countries: first Panachaiki F.C. in Greece then Spain's CF Extremadura, where he competed in both major divisions.

In 2002, after Extremadura dropped another category to the third level, Kalla signed with VfL Bochum in Germany– he scored five times in his last season, second-best in the squad – but the club was relegated from the Bundesliga. He also received a three-match ban for anti-doping rules breaching, in late 2003.

Subsequently, Kalla joined Turkish side Sivasspor for the 2005–06 campaign, returning home for two final years at Union Douala and retiring at age 33.

International career
Kalla won 63 caps for Cameroon, and was a participant at three consecutive FIFA World Cups: 1994, 1998 and 2002. In the first he (aged 19) played all the matches and minutes, often being partnered by another youngster, Rigobert Song (17), in an eventual group stage exit. He was part of the victorious 2000 and 2002 African Cup of Nations squads.

After the 2002 World Cup, Kalla announced to retire from the national team due to conflicts with the Federation structure, which he accused of poor organization, but eventually changed his mind.

Initially summoned for the 2006 Africa Cup of Nations, Kalla was forced to withdraw due to injury, and retired for the second and definitive time.

References

External links

1975 births
Living people
Footballers from Douala
Cameroonian footballers
Association football defenders
Canon Yaoundé players
Union Douala players
Super League Greece players
Panachaiki F.C. players
La Liga players
Segunda División players
CF Extremadura footballers
Bundesliga players
VfL Bochum players
Süper Lig players
Sivasspor footballers
Cameroon international footballers
1994 FIFA World Cup players
1998 FIFA World Cup players
2001 FIFA Confederations Cup players
2002 FIFA World Cup players
1998 African Cup of Nations players
2000 African Cup of Nations players
2002 African Cup of Nations players
Cameroonian expatriate footballers
Expatriate footballers in Greece
Expatriate footballers in Spain
Expatriate footballers in Germany
Expatriate footballers in Turkey
Cameroonian expatriate sportspeople in Greece
Cameroonian expatriate sportspeople in Spain
Cameroonian expatriate sportspeople in Germany